The 1981 Masters Tournament was the 45th Masters Tournament, held April 9–12 at Augusta National Golf Club in Augusta, Georgia. Tom Watson won his second green jacket and fifth major title by two strokes over Jack Nicklaus and Johnny Miller.

Five-time champion Nicklaus shot a bogey-free 65 on Friday and led by four strokes after 36 holes, but a 75 on Saturday put him a stroke behind Watson entering the final round. It was the fourth runner-up finish for Nicklaus at the Masters and the third for Miller. Nicklaus won his sixth Masters five years later in 1986 at age 46.

Defending champion Seve Ballesteros shot 154 (+10) and missed the cut by six strokes; he also missed the cut as defending champion in 1984. Lee Trevino, needing a green jacket to complete the career grand slam, also shot 154 with an ailing back. His best finishes at Augusta were tenth place ties in 1975 and 1985.

Greg Norman, age 26, appeared in his first Masters and was fourth, the first of his eight top-five finishes at Augusta.  He was runner-up three times, in 1986, 1987, and 1996.

This was the first Masters with bentgrass greens, which were formerly Bermuda and ryegrass.

Field
1. Masters champions
Tommy Aaron, George Archer, Seve Ballesteros (3,8), Gay Brewer, Billy Casper, Charles Coody, Raymond Floyd (8,11), Doug Ford, Bob Goalby, Jack Nicklaus (2,3,4,9,10), Arnold Palmer (8), Gary Player (8), Sam Snead, Art Wall Jr., Tom Watson (3,8,9,11), Fuzzy Zoeller (8,12)

Jack Burke Jr., Jimmy Demaret, Ralph Guldahl, Claude Harmon, Ben Hogan, Herman Keiser, Cary Middlecoff, Byron Nelson, Henry Picard, and Gene Sarazen did not play.

The following categories only apply to Americans

2. U.S. Open champions (last five years)
Hubert Green (8,12), Hale Irwin (9,11,12), Andy North (8,9), Jerry Pate (8)

3. The Open champions (last five years)
Johnny Miller (11)

4. PGA champions (last five years)
John Mahaffey (11,12), Dave Stockton, Lanny Wadkins (12)

5. 1980 U.S. Amateur semi-finalists
Jim Holtgrieve (7,a), Bob Lewis (a), Hal Sutton (6,7,a), Dick von Tacky (a)

6. Previous two U.S. Amateur and Amateur champions
Jay Sigel (7,a)

Mark O'Meara forfeited his exemption by turning professional.

7. Members of the 1980 U.S. Eisenhower Trophy team
Bob Tway (a)

8. Top 24 players and ties from the 1980 Masters Tournament
Andy Bean (10,11,12), Jim Colbert, Ben Crenshaw (11), Ed Fiori, Gibby Gilbert, Jay Haas, Tom Kite (11,12), Billy Kratzert (11), Gil Morgan (9,10,12), Larry Nelson (11,12), Calvin Peete, Jack Renner, Jim Simons, J. C. Snead

9. Top 16 players and ties from the 1980 U.S. Open
Keith Fergus, Joe Hager, Mark Hayes (12), Lon Hinkle (10), Joe Inman, Pat McGowan, Mike Morley, Mike Reid, Bill Rogers (10,11), Ed Sneed, Craig Stadler, Curtis Strange (10,11), Lee Trevino (10,11,12), Bobby Wadkins

10. Top eight players and ties from 1980 PGA Championship
Howard Twitty (11), Bobby Walzel

11. Winners of PGA Tour events since the previous Masters
John Cook, Bob Gilder, Phil Hancock, Scott Hoch, Peter Jacobsen, Wayne Levi, Bruce Lietzke, Mark Pfeil, Don Pooley, Scott Simpson, Mike Sullivan, Doug Tewell

12. Members of the U.S. 1979 Ryder Cup team
Lee Elder

13. Foreign invitations
Isao Aoki (9), Bruce Devlin (9), Duncan Evans (6,a), David Graham (4,8,11), Dan Halldorson (11), Sandy Lyle, Jack Newton (8), Greg Norman, Norio Suzuki

Numbers in brackets indicate categories that the player would have qualified under had they been American.

Round summaries

First round
Thursday, April 9, 1981

Source:

Second round
Friday, April 10, 1981

Source:

Third round
Saturday, April 11, 1981

Source:

Final round
Sunday, April 12, 1981

Final leaderboard

Sources:

Scorecard

Cumulative tournament scores, relative to par
Source:

References

External links
Masters.com – past winners and results
Augusta.com – 1981 Masters leaderboard and scorecards

1981
1981 in golf
1981 in American sports
1981 in sports in Georgia (U.S. state)
April 1981 sports events in the United States